Donald Raymond Moyer (April 15, 1930 – May 20, 1951) was a soldier in the United States Army during the Korean War. He posthumously received the Medal of Honor for his actions on May 20, 1951, during the UN May–June 1951 counteroffensive.

Moyer joined the Army from Keego Harbor, Michigan in 1948. He died May 20, 1951, near Seoul, Korea and is buried in Perry Mount Park Cemetery Pontiac, Michigan.

Medal of Honor citation
Rank and organization: Sergeant First Class, U.S. Army, Company E, 35th Infantry Regiment, 25th Infantry Division

Place and date: Near Seoul, Korea, May 20, 1951

Entered service at: Keego Harbor, Michigan Born: April 15, 1930, Pontiac, Michigan 

G.O. No.: 19, February 1, 1952

Citation:

Sfc. Moyer assistant platoon leader, Company E, distinguished himself by conspicuous gallantry and intrepidity at the risk of his life above and beyond the call of duty in action against an armed enemy of the United Nations. Sfc. Moyer's platoon was committed to attack and secure commanding terrain stubbornly defended by a numerically superior hostile force emplaced in well-fortified positions. Advancing up the rocky hill, the leading elements came under intense automatic weapons, small-arms, and grenade fire, wounding the platoon leader and platoon sergeant. Sfc. Moyer, realizing the success of the mission was imperiled, rushed to the head of the faltering column, assumed command and urged the men forward. Inspired by Sfc. Moyer's unflinching courage, the troops responded magnificently, but as they reached the final approaches to the rugged crest of the hill, enemy fire increased in volume and intensity and the fanatical foe showered the platoon with grenades. Undaunted, the valiant group forged ahead, and as they neared the top of the hill, the enemy hurled a grenade into their midst. Sfc. Moyer, fully aware of the odds against him, unhesitatingly threw himself on the grenade, absorbing the full blast of the explosion with his body. Although mortally wounded in this fearless display of valor, Sfc. Moyer's intrepid act saved several of his comrades from death or serious injury, and his inspirational leadership and consummate devotion to duty contributed significantly to the subsequent seizure of the enemy stronghold and reflect lasting glory on himself and the noble traditions of the military service.

See also

List of Medal of Honor recipients
List of Korean War Medal of Honor recipients

Notes

References

1930 births
1951 deaths
United States Army Medal of Honor recipients
American military personnel killed in the Korean War
Korean War recipients of the Medal of Honor
Deaths by hand grenade
People from Pontiac, Michigan
United States Army soldiers
United States Army personnel of the Korean War